The 2012–13 Liga Națională was the 55th season of Romanian Women's Handball League, the top-level women's professional handball league. The league comprises 11 teams. Z-Terom Iaşi did not register for the new season because it was dissolved. Oltchim Râmnicu Vâlcea were the defending champions, for the sixth season in a row.

Teams 2012–2013 

CSM București
HCM Baia Mare
Corona Braşov
SCM Craiova
Dunărea Brăila
Oltchim Râmnicu Vâlcea
Danubius Galaţi
CSM Ploieşti
HCM Roman
Universitatea Jolidon Cluj-Napoca
HC Zalău

Standings 

Liga Națională (women's handball)
2012 in Romanian women's sport
2013 in Romanian women's sport
2012–13 domestic handball leagues